Croatia competed at the 2011 World Aquatics Championships in Shanghai, China.

Medalists

Open water swimming

Men

Women

Swimming

Croatia qualified 7 swimmers.

Men

Women

Water polo

Men

Team Roster 

Josip Pavic
Damir Buric
Miho Boskovic
Niksa Dobud
Maro Jokovic
Petar Muslim
Frano Karac
Andro Buslje
Sandro Sukno
Samir Barac – Captain
Fran Paskvalin
Paulo Obradovic
Ivan Buljubasic

Group C

Quarterfinals

Semifinals

Bronze medal game

References

Nations at the 2011 World Aquatics Championships
2011 in Croatian sport
Croatia at the World Aquatics Championships